The Film Advisory Board (FAB) is a member-supported organization founded in 1975 by Elayne Blythe (1919–2005). The FAB's "Award of Excellence" was developed to award quality family-oriented and children's entertainment in both print and electronic media.

The second division of FAB is the FAB Ratings System. Originally developed by Elayne Blythe in four categories ("L", "V", "N" and "S", for (respectively) Language, Violence, Nudity and Sex), the present system was developed in 1988 at the request of independent film makers and distributors as an alternative to the Motion Picture Association of America film rating system. The FAB ratings system is intended to be less costly and more informative than the MPAA's system. The ratings fee is based on the film's running time instead of negative cost, and the ratings are based on the level of maturity of the material's intended audience, rather than the film's content.

While the FAB ratings system is not as recognized or well known as the MPAA's rating system, it is in use by a number of commercial video distributors for direct-to-video releases that would have been impractical to submit to the MPAA.

Film Advisory Board Rating System
The Film Advisory Board has six ratings categories. Each includes a brief description as to the rating's explanation, such as "Violence in Battle Scenes", "Substance Abuse" or "Brief Nudity".

Criticism of the "Seal of Excellence"

The Film Advisory Board has come under criticism as of late with the seemingly wide use of the FAB Seal of Excellence, with critics stating that while the seal denotes family-friendly entertainment, it does not always denote quality. Critic Erik Childress has criticized the Film Advisory Board for being hypocritical in its application of the Seal of Excellence, in part because it was applied to such films as Deck the Halls and the 2006 remake of The Pink Panther, both of which he felt violated the FAB's listed guidelines by including "strong sexual content...related to sex and titillation". When Gelf Magazine contacted Janet Stokes, current head of the FAB, about awarding the FAB Seal of Excellence to the box-office flop Deck the Halls, she admitted that the FAB does not review movies, but determines which are suitable for children:

References

External links
The only authorized official website of the Film Advisory Board is http://www.filmadvisoryboard.com
 
 "Seal of Doom" - Article by Jerry Beck, critical of the FAB Seal of Excellence

1975 establishments in the United States
Film organizations in the United States
Motion picture rating systems
Organizations established in 1975
Entertainment rating organizations